The 2006 FIBA Americas Under-20 Championship for Women was the second edition of the Americas under-20 women's basketball championship. The tournament took place in Mexico City, Mexico, from 8 to 12 August 2006. United States women's national under-20 basketball team won the tournament and became the Americas champions for the second time. The top three teams qualified for the 2007 FIBA Under-21 World Championship for Women.

Participating teams

Final standings

Results

References

Under-20
International sports competitions hosted by Mexico
Basketball in Mexico
August 2006 sports events in North America